Alexander Cruzata Rojas (born 26 July 1974) is a Cuban retired footballer.

Club career
Born in Cueto, Holguín Province, Cruzata played his entire career for his provincial team Holguín.

International career
Cruzata made his international debut for Cuba in 1996 and has earned a total of 74 caps, scoring 2 goals. He represented his country in 18 FIFA World Cup qualification matches (1 goal) and played at 4 CONCACAF Gold Cup final tournaments.

His final international appearance was in a 2005 CONCACAF Gold Cup group match unsuccessfully contesting Canada.

International goals
Scores and results list Cuba's goal tally first.

References

External links
 

1974 births
Living people
Cuban footballers
Cuba international footballers
Association football defenders
FC Holguín players
1998 CONCACAF Gold Cup players
2002 CONCACAF Gold Cup players
2003 CONCACAF Gold Cup players
2005 CONCACAF Gold Cup players
People from Holguín Province